The Seafarer 34 is an American sailboat that was designed by McCurdy & Rhodes as a cruiser and first built in 1972.

Production
The design was built by Seafarer Yachts in the United States, starting in 1972, but it is now out of production.

Design
The Seafarer 34 is a recreational keelboat, built predominantly of fiberglass, with a balsa-cored deck. It has a masthead sloop rig or optional yawl rig. The Seafarer 34 Mark II has a slightly taller rig. The hull has a raked stem; a raised counter, reverse transom; a skeg-mounted rudder controlled by a wheel and a fixed fin keel or optional stub keel and centerboard. It displaces  and carries  of lead ballast.

The boat is fitted with a Universal Atomic 4  gasoline engine for docking and maneuvering. A diesel engine was a factory option. The fuel tank holds .

The design has sleeping accommodation for five people, with a double "V"-berth in the bow cabin, an "L"-shaped, or optional "U"-shaped, settee around a drop-down table in the main cabin that forms a double berth. A straight settee on the starboard side is a single berth. The galley is located on the starboard side of the companionway ladder and is equipped with a stove, an ice box and a sink. A navigation station is opposite the galley, on the port side. The head is located just aft of the bow cabin on the port side. The fresh water tank has a capacity of 

See also
List of sailing boat types

References

External links
Photo of a Seafarer 34

Keelboats
1970s sailboat type designs
Sailing yachts
Sailboat type designs by McCurdy & Rhodes
Sailboat types built by Seafarer Yachts